Marcos Damián Maydana (born 26 June 1995) is an Argentine footballer.

Career

RFC Seraing
Maydana moved to Belgium in 2018 and joined Seraing. Maydana did not have a European passport and Seraing did not want to pay a non-EU player. As Maydana is of Italian origin, he tried to seek for an Italian passport. He waited for many months behind the scenes, waiting for the green light from the federation. The deal was then confirmed and announced on 7 November 2019. He signed a contract until the end of the season, with the option of an additional year.

References

Argentine footballers
Argentine expatriate footballers
1995 births
Living people
Club Atlético Patronato footballers
R.F.C. Seraing (1922) players
Argentine Primera División players
Belgian Third Division players
Challenger Pro League players
Association football fullbacks
Argentine expatriate sportspeople in Belgium
Expatriate footballers in Belgium
Sportspeople from Entre Ríos Province